Roop Nagar Ke Cheetey is an Indian Marathi language film directed by Vihan Suryavanshi and produced by Mannan Shaah under the banner of ACE Entertainment. The film stars Karan Parab, Kunal Shukla, Aayushi Bhave, Sana Prabhu, Mugdha Chaphekar and Hemal Ingle. The film was released on 16 September 2022.

Synopsis 
It depicts the journey of two childhood friends and their contrasting lives in two different cities after an incident. It presents some neglected aspects of friendship that have never been explored before.

Cast 
 Karan Parab as Akhil
 Kunal Shukla as Girish
 Hemal Ingle as Devika 
 Aayushi Bhave as Maya
 Mugdha Chaphekar as Kshipra 
 Sana Prabhu as Rati
 Akshay Kelkar as Sarang
 Saorabh Rajnish Choughule as Jagan
 Onkar Bhojane as Professor
 Rajit Kapur as Jatin
 Tanvika Parlikar as Smita 
 Ajit Pawar

Production and marketing 
A news report published by The Indian Express in December 2013 suggests that the film was announced back in 2013. The film's title is derived from a popular dialogue, 'Hum Roop Nagar Ke Cheetey Hain, Shikaar Par Hi Jeete Hain', of a 1990s Bollywood movie. It was announced as a Marathi-language film by its producer Mannan Shaah by sharing the film's motion poster on Instagram in January 2021. The shooting of the film was started in February 2021. The film was also shot in Pune, Maharashtra and Bangalore, Karnataka.

The first teaser of the film was released on YouTube in July 2022. The film's trailer was released on 2 September 2022, in YouTube. It is released on 16 September 2022.

Soundtrack 

The film score is composed by Mujeeb majeed while the songs featured in the film are composed by Mannan Shaah and Shaan Rahman, lyrics by Jai Atre and songs sung by Adarsh Shinde, Saurabh Salunke, Gowry Lekshmi, Narayani Gopan, Shaan Rahman and Sunidhi Chauhan.

Reception 
Sanjay Ghavare of Marathi newspaper Lokmat praises the performance of actors, cinematography and eye-catching locations of the film. The film's writing and direction were also praised. Anub George of The Times of India gave it 3.5 out of 5 stars, calling the film ‘surprises you with its nuanced approach toward storytelling.’

The film was rated 2.5 out of 5 by Jaydeep Pathakji, a film critic who writes for newspaper Maharashtra Times.

References

External links

2020s Marathi-language films
Indian drama films
Indian romance films
Indian comedy films